#5 is the sixth studio album by the Japanese rock band Ling Tosite Sigure, released on February 14, 2018. This album includes the band's previous single, "DIE meets HARD", which was used for the opening of the drama series Shimokitazawa DIE HARD. The album peaked at Number 5 on the Oricon chart; while the single peaked at Number 17 on the Oricon chart, and reached Number 46 on the Billboard Japan Hot 100.

Track listing
All tracks written and composed by Toru "TK" Kitajima.

References

External links 
 Ling tosite sigure discography 
 #5 by Ling Tosite Sigure on iTunes

2018 albums
Ling Tosite Sigure albums